Maple Grove may refer to:

Places

Canada
 Maple Grove, Nova Scotia
 Maple Grove, Ontario (disambiguation), several locations
 Maple Grove, Quebec

United States
 Maple Grove, California, a place in California
 Maple Grove, Illinois
 Maple Grove, Benzie County, Michigan, a census-designated place
 Maple Grove, Minnesota, a city
 Maple Grove, Missouri, an unincorporated community
 Maple Grove (Poughkeepsie, New York)
 Maple Grove, Ohio, an unincorporated community
 Maple Grove, Berks County, Pennsylvania
 Maple Grove, Utah, a former populated place in the west side of the Round Valley in eastern Millard County at base of the Pahvant Range
 Maple Grove, Virginia
 Maple Grove, Washington
 Maple Grove, Wisconsin (disambiguation), multiple locations

Other uses
 Maple Grove (St. Joseph, Missouri), a historic house
 Maple Grove Raceway, a dragstrip in Mohnton, Pennsylvania

See also

Maple Grove Township (disambiguation)
Sugar bush, a type of grove for farming maple for sugar/syrup